The 1987 Pacific-10 Conference men's basketball tournament was played March 5–8 at Pauley Pavilion in Los Angeles, California, on the UCLA campus.  The champion of the tournament was host 
UCLA, which received the Pac-10's automatic bid to the NCAA tournament.  The Most Outstanding Player was Reggie Miller 

This was the inaugural Pac-10 tournament. The format ran for four years, through 1990.

Seeds
All ten schools participated; teams were seeded by conference record, with a tiebreaker system used to seed teams with identical conference records.

Bracket

There were no overtime games

All tournament team
Reggie Miller, UCLA
Pooh Richardson, UCLA
Anthony Taylor, Oregon
Chris Welp, Washington
Phil Zevenbergen, Washington

Aftermath
 Oregon's win over #2 Arizona was the only upset of the 1987 tournament. 
 UCLA defeated Washington, who had swept them in the regular season. 
 The UCLA–Arizona State quarterfinal set a number of scoring records that still stand.
 UCLA received the automatic bid to the 1987 NCAA Division I men's basketball tournament. Arizona was the only other team that received an at-large bid to the NCAA tournament.
 Washington, California, and Oregon State were invited to the NIT. 
 Attendance for the sessions peaked at 9,352 for the Saturday game session, which were the semi-finals.
 Sunday's championship game had an attendance of 9,117 in the 12,829-seat Pauley Pavilion.
 Reggie Miller scored an individual tournament record of 83 points (3 games) which still stands as of 2022. Miller also set the individual tournament record 27 field goals (49 attempts).
 During the selection show for the 1987 NCAA tournament, there was a spot left open for the #12 seed in the Southeast Region. Kansas, the 5th seed in the region, was due to face either Washington or Houston in the first round. Washington was facing UCLA in the finals of the Pac-10 tournament at the time the selections were announced. UCLA held on to defeat Washington 76-62, putting Houston into the field of 64.

References

Tournament
Pac-12 Conference men's basketball tournament